Danielithosia immaculata is a species of moth of the family Erebidae first described by Arthur Gardiner Butler in 1880. It is found in Japan (Honshu, Kyushu, Shikoku, Ryukyus) and Taiwan. There are also records from Singapore, Bali, China and the Philippines.

The wingspan is 15–20 mm.

References

Moths described in 1880
Lithosiina
Moths of Japan
Moths of Singapore
Moths of Taiwan